K.C. Surendra Babu was an Indian Police Service Officer who was killed by Maoists in Bihar in 2005. At the time of his killing he was superintendent of police of Munger district. A 1997 batch IPS Surendra Babu along with his five bodyguards were killed in a landmine explosion triggered by the Maoists on January 5, 2005 inside Bhim Bandh wildlife sanctuary.

References

Indian police officers killed in the line of duty
Indian Police Service officers
People murdered in Bihar
Bihari politicians
2005 deaths
Deaths by improvised explosive device
Year of birth missing
2005 murders in India